Berthold of Ratisbon was a Franciscan of the monastery of Ratisbon and the most powerful preacher of repentance in the thirteenth century.

Biography
He was born about 1210. He was probably a member of a well-to-do middle-class family of Ratisbon named Sachs. The excellence of his literary training is proved by his sermons which show more than common acquaintance with the ancient classics. From his knowledge of the usages of secular life, it may be inferred that he was of mature age before he entered the monastery. The first fixed date in Berthold's life is 1246, when the papal legate appointed him and David of Augsburg inspectors of the convent of Niedermünster. One of his contemporaries, the Abbot of Niederaltaich, a reliable historian, speaks in 1250 of the great reputation that Berthold had in Bavaria as a preacher.

Four years later the missionary trips of this preacher extended as far as the valley of the Rhine, Alsace and Switzerland. During the next ten years Berthold's apostolic labours led him eastward into Austria, Moravia, Bohemia and Silesia. In 1263 Pope Urban IV appointed him to preach the Crusade and Albert the Great was designated as his assistant. When speaking to Slavonic audiences, Berthold naturally employed an interpreter, just as St. Bernard, in his day, made use of an interpreter in Germany. Notwithstanding any difficulties that might arise as to speech, wherever he went Berthold exerted an extraordinary power of attraction over his hearers so that the churches were not able to hold the great crowds of plain people who came from all quarters to his services, and he was often obliged to preach in the open air. When this was the case, a pulpit was generally arranged under the spreading branches of a linden tree. Long after his day "Berthold's linden" was to be seen at Glatz.

About 1270 he seems to have returned to Ratisbon where he remained until his death on 14 December 1272. He had fallen down all these stairs a few days prior.

Reputation and sermons
The Franciscan martyrology includes his name among the blessed of the order, and his remains form the most precious relic among the treasures of the cathedral at Ratisbon.  It is recorded that he would preach to up to 100,000 people at one time.

The poets and chroniclers of his time made frequent reference to Berthold. He was called "sweet Brother Berthold", "the beloved of God and man", "a second Elias", "the teacher of the nations"; all of these expressions are proofs of the high esteem in which his activities were held. The secret of the preacher's success lay partly in the saintliness of his life and partly in his power to make use of the language of humble life. He became the great master, it may be said, the classic of homely speech, and this rank has been maintained by his sermons to the present day. One of his two popular discourses on the Last Judgment became a favourite book of the people under the title "The Valley of Josaphat". There is no doubt that Brother Berthold preached in German.

For a long time scholars disagreed as to how his sermons had been preserved. It is now generally accepted that the sermons were often written down afterwards in Latin, frequently with marginal comments in German; these reports of the sermons, as they may be called, partly German, partly Latin, or at times in the language in which they were delivered, are what have been handed down to posterity.

The discourses thus preserved are of the greatest importance for the history of the development of the literature of homiletics; they are of equal value as rich sources for determining the condition of education and culture in the thirteenth century. It is difficult, therefore, to understand how this greatest of German preachers to the poor could have been forgotten for centuries. It was not until some of Brother Berthold's sermons were published in 1824 that attention was called to the eloquent Franciscan. Since this date, the enthusiasm for Berthold grew steadily so that he has become a favourite, both of Germanic scholars and of the historians of the development of German civilization. He is also regarded as the great pattern of homely pulpit eloquence.

References

1272 deaths
People from Regensburg
German Franciscans
German Christian monks
13th-century Roman Catholics
Year of birth unknown
13th-century German people